Fogiel is a surname. Notable people with the surname include:

Aleksander Fogiel (1910–1996), Polish actor and director
Marc-Olivier Fogiel (born 1969), French television and radio host
Mieczysław Fogiel (1901–1990), Polish singer
Radosław Fogiel (born 1982), Polish politician and sociologist
Sylvie Fogiel Bijaoui (born 1951), French-Israeli sociologist